Forthside is a rural locality in the local government area (LGA) of Devonport in the North-west and west LGA region of Tasmania. The 2016 census recorded a population of 81 for the state suburb of Forthside.

History 
Forthside is a confirmed locality.

Geography
The Forth River forms much of the western boundary, and the Don River forms a small part of the eastern.

Road infrastructure 
Route C145 (Forthside Road / Bellamy Road) runs through from north-west to east.

References

Towns in Tasmania
Devonport, Tasmania